R74 may refer to:

 R74 (South Africa), a road
 2012 Washington Referendum 74
 , a destroyer of the Royal Navy
 R-74 Oberwiesenfeld, a former military airfield in Germany